Cannabis in Cyprus is illegal for recreational use but legal for medical use.

Prohibition
Drugs are categorized into three categories in Cyprus. Drugs classified as A, B, or C. Cannabis is classified as a class B drug. The Narcotic Drugs and Psychotropic Substances Act of 1977 classified cannabis as a Class B substance. Class A medicines are the most dangerous, while class C drugs are the least dangerous. On the other hand, drug use and possession consequences apply to all classes. 

Personal possession is a serious criminal offense in Cyprus, and the subject has to face aggravating circumstances for the crime 

 Class A Drugs: Up to 12 years imprisonment
 Class B drugs: Up to Eight years imprisonment
 Class C drugs: Upto four years imprisonment

Arrest
In practice, an offender is taken to a local police station by drug enforcement where a statement, fingerprints, and/or a confession are taken. After minor interrogation, the offender is held overnight and then released to be later called to court where a judge will set a fine between 400-1000 Euro for a first time offence (depending on the amount of cannabis found and severity of the case). Factors such as being helpful to the police, full confession, completion of 6 month "detox" program provided by government and an apologetic attitude towards the judge does indeed help obtain a reduced fine.

Drug rehabilitation
The offender must appear at a detox center and complete a 6-month drug rehabilitation program at the end of which a relevant officer will send a letter to the judge in regard to their accomplishment. They will also receive an honorary diploma upon completion of the program. Non-completion of this 6-month program has unconfirmed consequences such as the fine being higher when sentenced at court.

Laws for selling cannabis or drug trafficking 
Selling or dealing in class C pharmaceuticals might result in up to eight years in jail, whereas dealing in class A or B medications could result in life imprisonment.

However, no one has been sentenced to life in prison yet!

Medical use
Cyprus legalized the medical use of cannabis oil in January 2017, for use by advanced state cancer patients only.  In February 2019 a more expansive law was passed that increased the number of qualifying medical conditions.

Cultivation
The island state has a comparative advantage over many other seasoned cannabis-producing states such as the Netherlands or Portugal. Its ideal climate conditions and its long periods of sunshine are very favorable to plant growth. The fact that it also belongs to the EU single market allows firms to base their operation on the island and passport services across various EU states without further regulatory checks. According to forecasts, Cyprus can produce more than €236 (£204) million worth of medicinal cannabis each year.

CBD Products’ legal status 
CBD products containing more than 0.2 % of THC are illegal in Cyprus. These are accessible in the form of edibles, cannabis-infused foods, lotions, cremes, cannabis oil, etc. Regardless, a merchant is not permitted to mention the health benefits of such items.

Legalization efforts 
In de facto independent Northern Cyprus, the first 420 event was held in the capital city Lefkoşa in 2015. On April 20, 2017 a small group of protesters carried out an event near the parliament building and made a public statement, demanding the legalization of cannabis sale, consumption, and production within state regulations.

See also 

 Cannabis in Northern Cyprus

References

 
Cyprus
Politics of Cyprus
Drugs in Cyprus
Society of Cyprus